The Slovenian Basketball Cup is an annual knockout basketball competition between the clubs from Slovenia. It is currently named Pokal Spar due to sponsorship reasons.

Title holders

 1991–92 Smelt Olimpija
 1992–93 Smelt Olimpija
 1993–94 Smelt Olimpija
 1994–95 Smelt Olimpija
 1995–96 Kovinotehna Savinjska Polzela
 1996–97 Smelt Olimpija
 1997–98 Union Olimpija
 1998–99 Union Olimpija
 1999–00 Union Olimpija
 2000–01 Union Olimpija
 2001–02 Union Olimpija
 2002–03 Union Olimpija
 2003–04 Pivovarna Laško
 2004–05 Union Olimpija
 2005–06 Union Olimpija
 2006–07 Helios Domžale
 2007–08 Union Olimpija
 2008–09 Union Olimpija
 2009–10 Union Olimpija
 2010–11 Union Olimpija
 2011–12 Union Olimpija
 2012–13 Union Olimpija
 2013–14 Krka
 2014–15 Krka
 2015–16 Krka
 2016–17 Union Olimpija
 2017–18 Sixt Primorska
 2018–19 Sixt Primorska
 2019–20 Koper Primorska
 2020–21 Krka
 2021–22 Cedevita Olimpija
 2022–23 Cedevita Olimpija

List of finals

{| class="wikitable sortable"
|-
!Year
!Location
!Winners
!Runners-up
!Score
!Most valuable player
|-
|1992
|Škofja Loka
|Smelt Olimpija
|Tinex Medvode
|align=center|108–50
|
|-
|1993
|Postojna
|Smelt Olimpija
|Optimizem Postojna
|align=center|78–77
|
|-
|1994
|Polzela
|Smelt Olimpija
|Kovinotehna Savinjska
|align=center|84–74
|
|-
|1995
|Radenci
|Smelt Olimpija
|Postojna
|align=center|97–77
|| Dušan Hauptman
|-
|1996
|Maribor
|Kovinotehna Savinjska
|BWC Maribor
|align=center|94–84
|| Klemen Zaletel
|-
|1997
|Polzela
|Smelt Olimpija
|Kovinotehna Savinjska
|align=center|72–60
|
|-
|1998
|Novo Mesto
|Union Olimpija
|Pivovarna Laško
|align=center|101–93
| Ariel McDonald
|-
|1999
|Ljubljana
|Union Olimpija
|Pivovarna Laško
|align=center|73–70
| Ivica Jurković
|-
|2000
|Laško
|Union Olimpija
|Pivovarna Laško
|align=center|71–70
| Šarūnas Jasikevičius
|-
|2001
|Zagorje
|Union Olimpija
|Krka Telekom
|align=center|73–69
| Emilio Kovačić
|-
|2002
|Ljubljana
|Union Olimpija
|Krka
|align=center|79–60
| Jiří Welsch
|-
|2003
|Domžale
|Union Olimpija
|Geoplin Slovan
|align=center|86–72
|
|-
|2004
|Maribor
|Pivovarna Laško
|Union Olimpija
|align=center|82–79
| Nebojša Joksimović
|-
|2005
|Škofja Loka
|Union Olimpija
|Pivovarna Laško
|align=center|107–69
| Sašo Ožbolt
|-
|2006
|Domžale
|Union Olimpija
|Pivovarna Laško
|align=center|78–71
| Tadej Koštomaj
|-
|2007
|Ljubljana
|Helios Domžale
|Union Olimpija
|align=center|77–70
| Robert Troha
|-
|2008
|Ljubljana
|Union Olimpija
|Helios Domžale
|align=center|85–66
| Jasmin Hukić
|-
|2009
|Laško
|Union Olimpija
|Elektra Esotech
|align=center|75–58
| Jasmin Hukić
|-
|2010
|Novo Mesto
|Union Olimpija
|Zlatorog Laško
|align=center|84–68
| Gašper Vidmar
|-
|2011
|Škofja Loka
|Union Olimpija
|Helios Domžale
|align=center|92–55
| Sašo Ožbolt
|-
|2012
|Brežice
|Union Olimpija
|Krka
|align=center|68–63
| Deon Thompson
|-
|2013
|Celje
|Union Olimpija
|Helios Domžale
|align=center|73–61
| Dino Murić
|-
|2014
|Maribor
|Krka
|Union Olimpija
|align=center|83–70
| Sani Bečirović
|-
|2015
|Laško
|Krka
|Zlatorog Laško
|align=center|77–67
| Chris Booker
|-
|2016
|Ljubljana
|Krka
|Lastovka
|align=center|66–33
| Luka Lapornik
|-
|2017
|Domžale
|Union Olimpija
|Krka
|align=center|86–81
| Nikola Janković
|-
|2018
|Ljubljana
|Sixt Primorska
|Šenčur GGD
|align=center|83–63
| Matic Rebec
|-
|2019
|Koper
|Sixt Primorska
|Hopsi Polzela
|align=center|91–72
| Marjan Čakarun
|-
|2020
|Ljubljana
|Koper Primorska
|Cedevita Olimpija
|align=center|93–84
| Aleksandar Lazić
|-
|2021
|Ljubljana
|Krka
|Šentjur
|align=center|72–66
| Luka Lapornik
|-
|2022
|Ljubljana
|Cedevita Olimpija
|Helios Suns
|align=center|99–80
| Edo Murić
|-
|2023
|Maribor
|Cedevita Olimpija
|Helios Suns
|align=center|81–70
| Alen Omić
|-

Performance by club

See also
Slovenian Premier A League
Slovenian Supercup

External links
Official website 

Recurring sporting events established in 1991
Basketball cup competitions in Slovenia
Basketball cup competitions in Europe
1991 establishments in Slovenia